MV Vikartindur was a German registered 8,633 ton container ship that became stranded on a beach on the south coast of Iceland on March 5, 1997, while en route from Tórshavn, the capital of the Faroe Islands, to Reykjavík.

She suffered engine failure at 1200 in stormy conditions and, although able to restart her main engine, she was not able to generate enough power to prevent the gale force winds from blowing her towards shore. Her anchor took hold 1.7 miles off the coast but its chain broke at 1900 and attempts by the ICGV Ægir of the Icelandic Coast Guard to attach a towing line were unsuccessful in the heavy seas. The Vikartindur ran aground at 2100 at 63 degrees 43.9 minutes north, 20 degrees 52.4 minutes west at 2100 and the crew of 19 were rescued by a helicopter TF-LÍF of the Icelandic Coast Guard. Once stranded the ship lay at an angle of 40 degrees and soon broke her back, precluding any attempt to refloat her. The ship was carrying 2,900 tons of cargo in containers.

The Vikartindur was broken up in situ on the beach using her own cranes.  The work was completed in August 1997, six months after she was wrecked.  She had been built in Stettin in Poland for Peter Dohle Schiffahrts-KG of Germany in 1996, the year before she was lost, and was chartered to the transportation company Eimskip, Reykjavík.

References

External links
 The Vikartindur in a list of 1997 shipping incidents
Pictures of the stranded Vikartindur

Container ships
Shipwrecks in the Atlantic Ocean
Maritime incidents in 1997